Rob(ert), Bob, or Bobby Jones may refer to:

Academics
 Bob Jones Sr. (1883–1968), Christian evangelist who founded Bob Jones University
 Bob Jones Jr. (1911–1997), Bob Jones, Sr.'s son, and second president of the university
 Bob Jones III (born 1939), Bob Jones, Sr.'s grandson, and third president of the university
 Bobby Jones (academic) (1932–2001), American academic
 Bobi Jones (Robert Maynard Jones, 1929–2017), Welsh Christian academic
 Robert B. Jones (linguist) (1920–2007), professor at Cornell University
 Robert J. Jones (born 1950/1951), crop physiology scientist

Entertainment

Music
 Robert Jones (composer) (died 1617), English lutenist and composer
 Robert Hope-Jones (1859–1914), English inventor of the theater organ
 Bobby Jones (saxophonist) (1928–1980), American jazz saxophonist
 Robert W. Jones (1932–1997), American classical composer
 Bobby Jones (singer) (born 1939), gospel singer
 Robert Jones (Welsh composer) (born 1945), Welsh composer, organist and choirmaster
 Rob "The Bass Thing" Jones (1964–1993), bass guitarist in the British band The Wonder Stuff

Other entertainment
 Robert Edmond Jones (1887–1954), American theater designer of sets, lighting, costumes
 Robert Earl Jones (1910–2006), American actor and father of James Earl Jones
 Robert F. Jones (1934–2002), American novelist and outdoors journalist
 Robert C. Jones (1936–2021), American screenwriter and film editor
 R.S. Jones (Robert S. Jones, 1954–2001), American novelist and editor
 Bob Devin Jones (born 1954), American playwright, director, and actor
 Rob Brydon (Robert Brydon Jones, born 1965), Welsh actor
 Bob Jones (sound engineer), British sound engineer for films
 Bob Jones, writer of the syndicated Goren Bridge newspaper column
 Bob Jones (illustrator) (1926–2018), American artist and advertising illustrator

Politics

Australia and Canada
 Robert Jones (Australian politician) (1845–1927), New South Wales politician
 Robert Jones (Lower Canada politician) (died 1844), land agent and politician in Lower Canada
 Robert Jones (Canada East politician) (died 1874), politician in Canada East

UK
 Robert Jones (of Castell-March), MP for Carnarvon in 1625 and Flintshire in 1628
 Robert Jones (died 1715) (1682–1715), British MP for Glamorganshire, 1712–1715
 Robert Jones (died 1774) (1704–1774), British MP for Huntingdon, 1754–1774
 Robert Jones (Labour politician) (1874–1940), British MP for Caernarvonshire, 1922–1923
 Robert Jones (Conservative politician) (1950–2007), British Conservative MP 1983–1997

US
 Robert McDonald Jones (1808–1872), Confederate politician
 Robert Taylor Jones (1884–1958), governor of Arizona
 Robert Franklin Jones (1907–1968), Ohio representative to US Congress, 1939–1947
 Robert E. Jones Jr. (1912–1997), US House of Representative from Alabama
 Robert G. Jones (born 1939), Louisiana state senator
 Robert Jones (Michigan politician) (1944–2010), Kalamazoo mayor, member of Michigan House of Representatives

Sports

American football
 Bob Jones (long snapper) (born 1978), American football player for the New York Giants
 Bob Jones (wide receiver) (born 1945), American football player for the Chicago Bears
 Bobby Jones (guard) (1912–1999), American football player for the Green Bay Packers
 Bobby Jones (wide receiver) (born 1955), American football wide receiver
 Robert Jones (linebacker) (born 1969), American football player for the Dallas Cowboys
 Robert Jones (offensive lineman) (born 1999), American football player for the Miami Dolphins

Association football
 Robert Albert Jones (1864–?), Druids F.C. and Wales international footballer
 Robert Jones (footballer, born 1868) (1868–1939), Everton, Ardwick and Wales international footballer
 Robert Reuben Jones (1902–?), footballer for Huddersfield Town, 1920s
 Bob Jones (footballer, born 1902) (1902–1989), football goalkeeper for Bolton Wanderers and Cardiff City, 1920s and 1930s
 Bobby Jones (footballer, born 1933) (1933–1998), footballer for Southport, Chester, and Blackburn
 Bobby Jones (footballer, born 1938) (1938–2015), footballer for Bristol Rovers, Northampton Town, and Swindon Town
 Rob Jones (footballer, born 1971), Welsh-born English international footballer, played for Liverpool in the 1990s
 Rob Jones (footballer, born 1979), English footballer for Doncaster Rovers

Baseball
Bobby Jones (right-handed pitcher) (born 1970), right-handed baseball pitcher
Bobby Jones (left-handed pitcher) (born 1972), left-handed baseball pitcher
Bobby Jones (outfielder) (born 1949), outfielder and manager/coach
Bob Jones (third baseman) (1889–1964), Major League Baseball player
Sug Jones (Robert Roosevelt Jones, 1907–1982), American baseball player

Basketball
Bob Jones (basketball, born 1940) (1940–2021), American basketball coach and athletic director at Kentucky Wesleyan College, 1972–1980
Bobby Jones (basketball, born 1951), American professional basketball player in the 1970s and 80s, member of Basketball Hall of Fame
Bobby Jones (basketball, born 1962), American basketball coach at Saint Francis University, high school athletic director
Bobby Jones (basketball, born 1984), American professional basketball player
Robert Jones (basketball, born 1979), American basketball coach at Norfolk State University

Cricket
 Rob Jones (cricketer) (born 1995), English cricketer
 Robert Jones (English cricketer) (born 1981), English cricketer
 Robert Jones (Barbadian cricketer) (1886-1951), Barbadian cricketer

Golf
 Bobby Jones (golfer) (1902–1971), American amateur golfer
 Robert Trent Jones (1906–2000), golf course architect
 Robert Trent Jones Jr. (born 1939), golf course architect

Horse Racing
 Robert Jones (jockey) (died 1938), aka Bobby Jones, American Champion jockey
 Bobby Jones (1904-1969), British Classic-winning jockey

Rugby
Bob Jones (rugby union) (1875–1944), Welsh rugby union forward
Bobby Jones (rugby union) (1900–1970), Welsh rugby player
Robert Jones (rugby, born 1921) (1921–?), rugby union and league footballer for Wales XV (RU), Glamorgan, Aberavon
Robert Jones (rugby union, born 1965), Wales and British Lions rugby union player

Other sports
 Bob Jones (Australian footballer) (born 1961), Australian rules footballer
 Robert Jones (ice hockey) (1877–?), goaltender for the Montreal Victorias
 Bob Jones (ice hockey) (born 1945), played in the NHL and WHA
 Rob Jones (rower), (born 1985), United States rower and 2012 Paralympic Games medalist

Business
 Bob Jones (businessman) (born 1939), New Zealand property investor and former politician
 Bob Jones (Texas businessman), former Texas businessman
 Robert "Fish" Jones (died 1930), American fish market owner, zoo owner

Law
 Robert Noble Jones (1864–1942), New Zealand lawyer, public servant and land court judge
 Robert E. Jones (judge) (born 1927), Oregon Supreme Court and federal district judge
 Robert Byron Jones (1833–1867), Justice of the Louisiana Supreme Court
 Robert Clive Jones (born 1947), American federal judge
 Bob Jones (police commissioner) (1955–2014), in the West Midlands of England
 Robert Jones (wrongful conviction) (born 1973), exonerated after conviction for a 1992 murder

Military
 Robert Jones (artilleryman), 18th-century British popularizer of figure skating and fireworks
 Robert Jones (VC) (1857–1898), Welsh recipient of the Victoria Cross
 Robert Jephson Jones (1905–1985), British bomb disposal expert awarded the George Cross

Religion
 Robert Elijah Jones (1872–1960), United States clergyman, Bishop of the Methodist Episcopalian Church
 Robert Jones (archdeacon of Worcester) (born 1955), English Anglican priest
 Robert Jones (dean of Clonmacnoise) (born 1947), Dean of Clonmacnoise
 Robert Jones (writer) (1810–1879), Welsh Anglican priest and writer

Science
 Sir Robert Jones, 1st Baronet (1857–1933), British orthopaedic surgeon
 Robert Thomas Jones (engineer) (1910–1999), NASA aeronautical engineer
 Robert Clark Jones (1916–2004), American physicist
 Robert Jones (aerodynamicist) (1891-1962), Welsh aerodynamicist

Other
 Robert Jones (designer), British cabinet maker and designer
 Robert J. Jones (trade unionist) (1899-1962), Welsh trade union leader
 Robert Lawton Jones (1925-2018), American architect from Oklahoma, noted for his contributions to modern art 
 Bob Jones (Grand Dragon) (1930-1989), a Ku Klux Klan official in the 1960s
 Bob Jones Award, an award given by the United States Golf Association
 Bob Jones High School, Madison, the largest public high school in the state of Alabama
 Bob Jones University, founded by Bob Jones, Sr
 Bob Jones University v. United States, a United States Supreme Court decision

See also
 Robert Johns (disambiguation)
Bert Jones (disambiguation)
Robbie Jones (disambiguation)